Hardy Ivy Park is a pocket park in downtown Atlanta, Georgia, United States.

History 

The namesake for the park is Hardy Ivy, who is generally considered the first person of European descent to settle in what is now Atlanta. According to The Atlanta Journal-Constitution, the name was chosen to appease the Ivy family after Ivy Street was renamed Peachtree Center Avenue in the late 20th century. The park is located on a small triangular tract of land at the divergence of Peachtree Street and West Peachtree Street in downtown.

In May 1896, the city of Atlanta commemorated the Erskine Memorial Fountain in honor of Judge John Erskine at the location. In order to make room for the fountain, a marble statue of Benjamin Harvey Hill was moved from the park to the Georgia State Capitol. The fountain, designed by sculptor J. Massey Rhind, was later relocated to Grant Park in 1912.

In the later half of the 20th century, the park received another statue. Several years after the closing of Terminal Station, a statue of Samuel Spencer, which had stood in front of the station since 1910, was moved to the park. The statue has since been moved to a location in midtown Atlanta. In the late 1990s, the Carnegie Education Pavilion was moved to the park, where it currently still stands. In 2011, the government of Atlanta officially renamed the plaza in the park the Xernona Clayton Plaza in honor of civil rights leader Xernona Clayton. An accompanying plaque honors her career.

References

Bibliography 

 
 
 
 
 
 
 
 

Parks in Atlanta